Radio Slovenia International (RSi) is the international service of Slovenian state radio on FM, Internet and via satellite.

RSi is the only foreign-language radio station in Slovenia. Its broadcasts are in Slovene, German and English.

RSi offers a mixture of musical and informative programmes 24 hours a day. 85% of the programme time is devoted to international and Slovene hits, and the remaining 15% is intended for political, business and economic, cultural, and sports information.

The central programme elements are weather, traffic, cultural and sports information, as well as information on events taking place in Slovenia.

External links
Radio Slovenia International Website 

Radio stations in Slovenia
International broadcasters